Film Magazine was a film weekly news magazine published in Malayalam language from Kerala, India. It was printed at Thiruvananthapuram and distributed throughout Kerala by Kalakaumudi Publications Private Limited. Although the magazine had connections to Kerala Kaumudi newspaper, it was an independent company. It highlighted the doings and happenings of the Mollywood film scene. It was one of the most popular entertainment magazine in Malayalam, but Kalakaumudi discontinued it and launched Vellinakshatram.

References

Defunct magazines published in India
Film magazines published in India
Weekly magazines published in India
Malayalam-language magazines
Magazines with year of establishment missing
Magazines with year of disestablishment missing
Mass media in Kerala